Grenfell was an electoral district of the Legislative Assembly in the Australian state of New South Wales, created in November 1880, partly replacing Lachlan, and named after and including the Central West town of Grenfell. It was abolished in 1904, with the downsizing of the Legislative Assembly after Federation.

Members for Grenfell

Election results

References

Former electoral districts of New South Wales
1880 establishments in Australia
1904 disestablishments in Australia
Constituencies established in 1880
Constituencies disestablished in 1904